Below is a list of German language exonyms for towns and villages in the Vojvodina region of Serbia . This list excludes names where only the spelling changes.

List of names

See also
German exonyms
List of European exonyms
List of cities, towns and villages in Vojvodina

External links
German Genealogy: Donauschwaben Village List Index

Vojvodina
Languages of Vojvodina
Danube Swabian communities
Names of places in Vojvodina